Dement House may refer to:

Dement House (Meridian, Mississippi), a Mississippi Landmark
Dement House (Lascassas, Tennessee), listed on the National Register of Historic Places in Rutherford County, Tennessee
Dement-Zinser House, Washington, Illinois, listed on the National Register of Historic Places in Tazewell County, Illinois

See also
Dement Printing Company, Meridian, Mississippi, listed on the National Register of Historic Places in Lauderdale County, Mississippi